Oleśnica Castle
is a castle in Oleśnica, Lower Silesian Voivodeship, southwestern Poland.

History 
It was erected in 1542–1561, replacing a Gothic fortress from the thirteenth century. It was the seat of the Dukes of Oleśnica until the nineteenth century. A fortified settlement was mentioned before the year 1238, and the first record of the castle dates from 1292. After World War II, the surviving buildings held Hungarian and Italian prisoners of war. Later, there was the Soviet branch office of the International Committee of the Red Cross. In the 1970s the castle underwent another renovation and it became a branch of the Archaeological Museum in Wroclaw, until abandoned in 1993. It has since been reoccupied by the Voluntary Labour Corps.

See also
 Castles in Poland

References

External links 

 Official website of castle

Castles in Lower Silesian Voivodeship
Oleśnica County
1561 establishments in Europe
Buildings and structures completed in 1561